Daniel Kwame Awuni (born 13 February 2006) is a Ghanaian footballer currently playing as a forward for Accra Lions.

Club career
Awuni signed for Ghana Premier League side Accra Lions from Topscout Football Academy in September 2021. His career in Accra got off to a good start, with Awuni finding the net multiple times for his new club.

Career statistics

Club

Notes

References

2006 births
Living people
Ghanaian footballers
Association football forwards
Ghana Premier League players